The Hand That Feeds is an English language documentary film written and directed by Robin Blotnick and Rachel Lears. It chronicles the struggles of undocumented immigrant workers as they attempt to achieve fair wages and better working conditions in New York’s Upper East Side. Since its premiere at the Full Frames Festival in January 2014, the film has received acclaim from critics as well as multiple awards including a nomination for the 2017 Outstanding Business and Economic Documentary Emmy.

Plot summary 

The film focuses on a group of undocumented immigrants who prepare and serve food and coffee to residents of New York’s Upper East Side. The Cafe at which they work, 63rd Street Hot and Crusty, appears from the outside to be a fair and efficient business, however, the film reveals a situation in which workers face sub-legal wages, dangerous machinery and abusive managers who will fire them for calling in sick.

In January 2012, led by sandwich maker Mahoma Lopez, the group unionised in an attempt to get their voice heard and achieve fair working conditions. With the assistance of a number of inspired organisers from the Occupy Wall Street movement, the workers risk deportation and the loss of their livelihood as they embark on a year-long battle for a living wage against reluctant New York City investors. Their plight is complicated when their complaint to the New York State Department of Labor is ignored, as well as their requests to join larger unions on the grounds that their restaurant is too small. Their case is fought in court and on the streets as they endeavour to promote a greater recognition of undocumented workers within the United States' economy, and the injustices they face.

Cast 

 Virgilio Arán - Himself
 Benjamin Dictor - Himself
 Diego Ibanez - Himself
 Gonzalo Jimenez - Himself
 Elizabeth Lopez - Herself
 Mahoma Lopez - Himself 
 Margarito Lopez - Himself
 Nastraran Mohit - Herself
 Diana Ortiz - Herself
 Rosanna Rodriguez - Herself
 Felicito Tapia - Himself

Production 
The film was produced by Jubilee Productions who operated under an estimated budget of $370,000. The film was almost entirely shot in New York City.

Release 
The film debuted in April 2014 at the 22nd Annual Full Frame Documentary Film Festival held in Durham, North Carolina where it won the Audience Award.

Reception

Critical response 
The Hand That Feeds Us received critical acclaim, with a 93% rating on Rotten Tomatoes based on 14 reviews. On Metacritic, the film has a weighted average score of 60 out of 100, indicating "generally favorable reviews".

Ben Kenisberg of The New York Times, complimented Blotnick and Lears' ability to illuminate an important political issue, lauding the film as "an effective portrayal of the intricacies of activism – and of a situation in which victories seem all too brief." Peter Keough of The Boston Globe commends the positive motivation for the film and the intelligent delivery of its message, claiming it to be "socially conscious documentary film-making at its best." Diana Clark of The Village Voice applauded the documentary’s entertainment value, writing that it was "filmed with the urgency and suspense of a Hitchcock thriller."

Despite the vast majority of critical reviews praising both the political message of the film and the technical prowess of its makers, it has induced some more negative responses. Such reviews predominately have issue with the imbalance of opinions represented in the film. Martin Tsai for the Los Angeles Times articulates this concern saying that "when the employer declined an interview, the filmmakers could have - but apparently didn’t - reach out to unaffiliated legal or labor experts for comment. Instead, we got lots of blurred-out signs, unnamed parties, first-name-only interviewees, pointless establishing shots and a manipulative score." Further, he believes the film "barely substantiates the hardships of workers and does not put their quality of life into any kind of statistical perspective."

Accolades 

 DOC NYC (2014) - Audience award, Full Frame Documentary Film Festival (2014) - Audience Award (Won)
 Sidewalk Film Festival (2014) - Best Documentary (Won)
 Emmy Award (2017) - Outstanding Business and Economic Documentary (Nominated)
 Cleveland International Film Festival (2014) - Greg Gund Memorial Standing Up Award (Nominated)
 DOC NYC (2014) - Metropolis Grand Jury Prize (Nominated)

Political Significance

Improper Entrance and Unlawful Presence 
Under United States federal criminal law, it is a misdemeanour for a non-citizen to enter or attempt to enter the United States at any time or place other than designated by immigration officers, elude examination or inspection by immigration officers, or attempt to enter or obtain entry to the United States by wilfully concealing, falsifying, or misrepresenting material facts.

Although some of the workers who were a part of the union in the film lacked legal status, as far as the film shows, none of them were guilty of improper entry. A vast number of foreigners enter the United States legally but then fail to renew their visa or leave the country before their original visa expires. However, merely being unlawfully present in the country is not a crime. Although it is a breach of federal immigration law to remain in the country, it is not punishable by criminal penalties, but rather civil ones.

According to a study conducted by the Pew Research Center of the approximately 11 million immigrants unlawfully present in the United States, nearly 8 million of them are active in the labor force. Their representation by industry is pronounced, making up over half of the hired labor on farms and 9% of jobs in the service sector. The majority of these service sector jobs are in domestic help and fast food. Overall, unlawful immigrants make up approximately 5% of the American labor force.

The Hand That Feeds presents the issues surrounding the rights of unlawful immigrants and their impact on the American economy from the perspective of such workers.

Occupy Wall Street 

Occupy Wall Street (OWS) is a left-wing protest movement that began on September 17, 2011, in Zuccotti Park, located in New York City's Wall Street financial district, against economic inequality. The movement was initiated by Canadian anti-consumerist magazine Adbusters in response to concerns over social and economic inequality, corruption and the unreasonable influence of corporations on government, specifically from the financial services sector. The OWS slogan, "We are the 99%", is a comment on the vast income disparity between the wealthiest 1% of Americans and the rest of the population.

Protests were largely performed in Zuccotti Park until on November 15, 2011, the group was forced to relocate. Protesters shifted their focus to occupying banks, corporate headquarters and university campuses. Members of the OWS finance committee initiated a process to streamline the movement by carefully allocating funds to worthy "working groups". Although the film does not reveal the full extent of OWS involvement in the lives of the workers in the film, at the very least a "working group" of OWS advocates are shown to be proving financial and logistical support to the workers of 63rd Street Hot and Crusty in their quest for fair wages and better working conditions.

 Changing The Food Chain 
Changing The Food Chain is a collaboration between Food Chain Workers Alliance and The Hand That Feeds. An online interactive map aims to facilitate community engagement with organisations that support workers in the American food industry.'''

Both The Food Chain Workers Alliance and the makers of the film recognise the importance of developing a more sustainable food system in the United States in order to ensure a desirable level of wellbeing amongst workers, employers and consumers. This is evident in the size and growth rate of the food sector in the US economy. With the food system comprising approximately 20 million workers, one in six US workers are employed within the food sector, making it the single largest private-sector employer in the country.

Organisations within Changing The Food Chain are divided into four different categories.

 Work Centres: Organisations that provide assistance to low-wage, often immigrant workers who are not represented by a union or similar advocacy bodies or those who are not subject to labor laws.
 Advocacy Groups: Any group seeking to promote the agendas of the public in order to affect policy change at the local, state and national level.
 Service Organisations: Organisations that provide services such as legal assistance, education or real estate agency.
 Unions: Organisations that are legally recognised to equip groups of workers with collective bargaining powers when disputing issues regarding working conditions, wages and contract violations.Changing The Food Chain'' implores those that are interested in contributing to the cause to find an organisation near you, learn more about local issues, learn your rights, organise your workplace, become a community supporter, advocate for change and finally actualise the movement.

References

External links 

 
 The Hand That Feeds at IMDb

2014 documentary films
American docufiction films
Documentary films about labor relations in the United States
2010s American films